The 2007 ICC Africa Under-19 Championship was a cricket tournament held in South Africa from 25–30 August 2007. All matches were held at the Willowmoore Park complex in Benoni, Gauteng.

Namibia won the tournament by defeating Kenya in the final, qualifying for the 2008 Under-19 World Cup in Malaysia. Two African under-19 sides, South Africa and Zimbabwe, are ICC full members, and thus qualified directly for the World Cup. Namibian batsman Sean Silver and Uganda bowler Charles Waiswa led the tournament in runs and wickets, respectively.

The tournament was the second edition of the ICC Africa Under-19 Championships, after the inaugural championship in 2001. In 2003 and 2005, a joint World Cup qualification tournament had been organised by ICC Africa and ICC East Asia-Pacific. The 2007 championships were the last at which there was only a single division – from the 2009 tournament onwards, there have been two divisions.

Teams and qualification 
All six African teams at the 2005 Africa/EAP Under-19 Championship qualified for the tournament, with the places of the two ICC East Asia-Pacific teams (Fiji and Papua New Guinea) taken by Botswana and Ghana:

Preparation

Group stage

Pool A

Source: CricketArchive

Pool B 

Source: CricketArchive

Finals

7th-place playoff

5th-place playoff
Two "semi-finals" for the fifth-place playoff were held, in which Ghana defeated Tanzania by seven wickets and Zambia defeated Nigeria by 315 runs. The two losing teams played each other in the seventh-place playoff.

3rd-place playoff

Final
Two semi-finals were held, in which Kenya defeated Botswana by four wickets and Namibia defeated Uganda by nine wickets. The two losing teams played each other in the third-place playoff.

Statistics

Most runs
The top five runscorers are included in this table, ranked by runs scored and then by batting average.

Source: CricketArchive

Most wickets

The top five wicket takers are listed in this table, ranked by wickets taken and then by bowling average.

Source: CricketArchive

References 

Under-19 regional cricket tournaments
Cricket in Gauteng
International cricket competitions in 2007
2007 in South African cricket
International cricket competitions in South Africa